Elections in the Republic of India in 1989 included the 1989 Indian general election,  elections to eight state legislative assemblies and to seats in the Rajya Sabha.

General election

Legislative Assembly elections

Andhra Pradesh

Source:

Goa

Karnataka

|- align=center
!style="background-color:#E9E9E9" class="unsortable"|
!style="background-color:#E9E9E9" align=center|Political Party
!style="background-color:#E9E9E9" |Seats contested
!style="background-color:#E9E9E9" |Seats won
!style="background-color:#E9E9E9" |Number of Votes
!style="background-color:#E9E9E9" |% of Votes
!style="background-color:#E9E9E9" |Seat change
|-
| 
|align="left"|Indian National Congress||221||178||7,990,142||43.76%|| 113
|-
| 
|align="left"|Janata Dal||209||24||4,943,854||27.08%||New Party
|-
| 
|align="left"|Bharatiya Janata Party||118||4||755,032||4.14%|| 2
|-
| 
|align="left"|Janata Party (JP)||217||2||2,070,341||11.34%||New Party
|-
|
|align="left"|Karnataka Rajya Raitha Sangha||105||2||654,801||3.59%||New Party
|-
| 
|align="left"|AIADMK||1||1||32,928||0.18%||New Party
|-
| 
|align="left"|Muslim League||13||1||80,612||0.44%||New Party
|-
| 
|align="left"|Independents||1088||12||1,482,482||8.12%|| 1
|-
|
|align="left"|Total||2043||224||18,257,909||
|-
|}

Mizoram

Nagaland

Sikkim

Tamil Nadu

|-
! style="background-color:#E9E9E9;text-align:left;vertical-align:top;" |Alliance/Party
!style="width:4px" |
! style="background-color:#E9E9E9;text-align:right;" |Seats won
! style="background-color:#E9E9E9;text-align:right;" |Change
! style="background-color:#E9E9E9;text-align:right;" |Popular Vote
! style="background-color:#E9E9E9;text-align:right;" |Vote %
! style="background-color:#E9E9E9;text-align:right;" |Adj. %‡
|-
! style="background-color:#FF0000; color:white"|DMK+ alliance
! style="background-color: " |
| 169
| +137
| 9,135,220
| colspan=2 style="text-align:center;vertical-align:middle;"| 37.9%
|-
|DMK
! style="background-color: #FF0000" |
| 150
| +126
| 8,001,222
| 33.2%
| 38.7%
|-
|CPI(M)
! style="background-color: #000080" |
| 15
| +10
| 851,351
| 3.5%
| 36.5%
|-
|JNP
! style="background-color: #FFFF00" |
| 4
| +1
| 282,647
| 1.2%
| 29.1%
|-
! style="background-color:#009900; color:white"|AIADMK+ alliance
! style="background-color: " | 
| 34
| -100
| 7,757,452
| colspan=2 style="text-align:center;vertical-align:middle;"| 32.2%
|-
|AIADMK(J)
! style="background-color: lime" |
| 27
| rowspan=3 style="text-align:right;"|-101
| 5,098,687
| 22.2%
| 25.0%
|-
|AIADMK(JA)
! style="background-color: olive" |
| 2
| 2,214,965
| 9.2%
| 12.2%
|-
|AIADMK(United)
! style="background-color: #008000" |
| 2
| 148,630
| 0.6%
| 37.4%
|-
|CPI
! style="background-color: #0000FF" |
| 3
| +1
| 295,170
| 1.2%
| 21.3%
|-
! style="background-color:gray; color:white"|Others
! style="background-color:gray" |
| 31
| -37
| 7,218,796
| colspan=2 style="text-align:center;vertical-align:middle;"| 29.9%
|-
|INC
! style="background-color: #00FFFF" |
| 26
| -37
| 4,780,714
| 19.8%
| 21.8%
|-
|IND
! style="background-color: #666666" |
| 5
| +1
| 2,164,484
| 9.0%
| 9.1%
|-
| style="text-align:center;" |Total
! style="background-color: " |
| 234
| –
| 24,111,468
| 100%
| style="text-align:center;" | –
|-
|}

†: Seat change reflects 33 MLAs that supported Jayalalithaa faction and 97 MLAs that supported Janaki faction (2 MLAs that supported her had their constituency election in a later March by-election after the merge). It also reflects GKC merging with INC and AKD not winning a seat after winning a seat in 1984.
‡: Vote % reflects the percentage of votes the party received compared to the entire electorate that voted in this election. Adjusted (Adj.) Vote %, reflects the % of votes the party received per constituency that they contested.
Sources: Election Commission of India

Uttar Pradesh

Rajya Sabha

References

External Links
 

1989 elections in India
India
1989 in India
Elections in India by year